Ukraine competed at the 1993 Winter Universiade in Zakopane, Poland. Ukraine won one gold medal.

Medallists

See also
 Ukraine at the 1993 Summer Universiade

References

Sources
 Results

Ukraine at the Winter Universiade
Winter Universiade